Louis Kébreau (born November 8, 1938 in Jérémie) is a Haitian clergyman who was bishop for the Roman Catholic Diocese of Hinche and the Roman Catholic Archdiocese of Cap-Haïtien. He was ordained in 1974. He was appointed bishop in 1998. He retired in 2018. CH</ref>

References

1938 births
Living people
Haitian Roman Catholic bishops
People from Jérémie
Roman Catholic bishops of Hinche